The San Antonio Brahmas are a professional American football team based in San Antonio, Texas. The team is an owned-and-operated member of the XFL, owned by RedBird Capital Partners, Dwayne Johnson and Dany Garcia's Alpha Acquico, LLC. The Brahmas play their home games at the Alamodome.

History

Dwayne Johnson and Dany Garcia era (2023–present) 
The XFL played its first season in 2020 with eight teams, as a reboot to the league of the same name that played in 2001. After five games, it was suspended due to the COVID-19 pandemic. Prior to the league's April bankruptcy, the XFL had begun discussions with San Antonio to relocate one of its eight teams there. It had been unavailable as a market at the time of the league's launching due to the Alliance of American Football placing the San Antonio Commanders (that league's best-attended team) there, and because of the XFL's policy at the time of preferring cities that already had NFL franchises.

After XFL founder Vince McMahon sold the league to a consortium led by businesswoman Dany Garcia and her ex-husband, business partner, and former WWE wrestler Dwayne Johnson, and the league did not play in 2021 or 2022, it was announced the league would return for the 2023 season. In March 2022, rumors of a San Antonio XFL team again emerged after the league hired Reggie Barlow, reportedly to serve as the team's coach; Barlow instead would be assigned to the DC Defenders. The league announced in July 2022 that three teams from the 2020 would be replaced, and five would return, and that San Antonio would be among the three new cities, ultimately replacing the LA Wildcats.

The July announcement revealed San Antonio's head coach as Hines Ward and their stadium as the Alamodome. On October 31, 2022, the logo was revealed and the team name was announced as the San Antonio Brahmas. The Brahma name is of Hindu origin, coming from the Hindu creator god; more directly, the Brahmas name comes from the American Brahman, a hybrid species cross-bred from sacred zebu and American cattle that Johnson has long used as a personal mascot. The XFL Brahmas team jerseys were revealed on December 8; their uniforms will be yellow-gold and grey. In the 2023 XFL Draft, the Brahmas were allocated quarterbacks Jawon Pass and Anthony Russo and used their top pick to select running back Jacques Patrick.

The 2023 XFL season began on February 18, 2023 and will feature 40 regular season games.

Market overview 
The Brahmas are the first professional football team in San Antonio since the San Antonio Commanders of the Alliance of American Football in 2019, who averaged over 27,000 fans per game. The Brahmas join the San Antonio Spurs and San Antonio FC as professional sports teams in San Antonio. The Brahmas also join the San Antonio Gunslingers as football teams located in San Antonio.

Staff

Players

Current roster

Player and staff history

Head coach history

Offensive coordinator history

Defensive coordinator history

Current notable players 

 Kalen Ballage, former Miami Dolphins running back, 4th-round pick in 2018 NFL Draft

References